Urmas Kõljalg (born 24 February 1961) is an Estonian biologist, mycologist and university professor.

He has recombined the following taxon:
 Amaurodon aeruginascens (Hjortstam & Ryvarden) Kõljalg & K.H. Larss.

References

1961 births
Estonian biologists
Estonian mycologists
Estonian educators
Living people
University of Tartu alumni
Academic staff of the University of Tartu
Recipients of the Order of the White Star, 5th Class